Benjamin G. Whittaker (born 6 June 1997) is an English professional boxer. As an amateur he won a silver medal at the 2020 Summer Olympics.

Amateur career
In 2018, he was picked to represent England in the 2018 Commonwealth Games, which took place in Australia's Gold Coast.

In 2019, he was selected to compete at the World Championships in Yekaterinburg, Russia, where he won the bronze medal after losing by unanimous decision to Dilshodbek Ruzmetov in the semi-finals.

In 2021, at the men's light-heavyweight category at the 2020 Tokyo Olympics, Whittaker won the silver medal against Arlen Lopez, who won gold.

Whittaker tweeted, "You don't win silver, you lose gold. I'm very disappointed - I feel like a failure."

Distraught from falling short of gold, he refused to wear the medal at the ceremony; however, he vowed he would return to win gold, saying: "I'll come back, trust me."

Whittaker's passionate reaction drew mixed reactions, but most people were empathetic of Whittaker's reaction. English media personality Piers Morgan tweeted: "Love this - finally, an athlete at these Olympics prepared to tell the truth about competing in elite sport. Good for you @BenGWhittaker".

Professional career
In 2022 he signed a professional deal with Boxxer, training with SugarHill Steward.

Professional boxing record

Notes

References

1997 births
Living people
English male boxers
Sportspeople from West Bromwich
Boxers at the 2018 Commonwealth Games
Commonwealth Games competitors for England
Boxers at the 2019 European Games
European Games medalists in boxing
European Games silver medalists for Great Britain
AIBA World Boxing Championships medalists
Light-heavyweight boxers
Boxers at the 2020 Summer Olympics
Olympic boxers of Great Britain
Medalists at the 2020 Summer Olympics
Olympic silver medallists for Great Britain
Olympic medalists in boxing